Gattamraju Ravindra Kumar (born 15 June 1961) is an Indian laser physicist and a senior professor of Nuclear and Atomic Physics at Tata Institute of Fundamental Research. Known for his research on Ultrashort pulse and Warm dense matter, Kumar is an elected fellow of the Indian Academy of Sciences and the Indian National Science Academy. The Council of Scientific and Industrial Research, the apex agency of the Government of India for scientific research, awarded him the Shanti Swarup Bhatnagar Prize for Science and Technology, one of the highest Indian science awards, for his contributions to physical sciences in 2003. He is also a recipient of the B. M. Birla Science Prize and Infosys Prize.

Biography 

Born on 15 June 1961, Ravindra Kumar did his graduate honors degree in mechanical engineering from Birla Institute of Technology and Science, Pilani and continued there to earn an master's degree MSc honors degree in physics in 1983. Subsequently, he enrolled for doctoral studies at the Indian Institute of Technology, Kanpur from where he secured a PhD in 1990. His post-doctoral work was also at IIT Kanpur and in 1992, he joined Tata Institute of Fundamental Research where he is a senior professor of the Department of Nuclear and Atomic Physics, heading  UPHILL (Ultra-short Laser Pulse High Intensity Laser Laboratory.

Legacy 
Kumar is known to have established UPHILL (Ultra-short Laser Pulse High Intensity Laser Laboratory), a centre for advanced laser experiments at Tata Institute of Fundamental Research. Here, he heads a group of scholars and researchers who are involved in studies related to laser-matter interactions. He is reported to have worked on the generation of megagauss magnetic pulses using ultrafast laser pulses and his group observed the turbulent magnetic fields created by instabilities of the high current electron beams driven by the laser pulse for the first time. Nanoparticle coated surfaces and pendular states of molecules are two of the other areas of his research. His studies have been documented by way of a number of articles and the online article repository of the Indian Academy of Sciences has listed 75 of them. He has also guided a number of students in their doctoral studies. He is a member of the Optical Society of America and sits in the International Committee on Ultra-High Intensity Lasers of the International Union of Pure and Applied Physics. He is also a life member of Indian Society for Mass Spectrometry, Indian Society of Atomic and Molecular Physics, Plasma Science Society of India and Indian Laser Association. Plenary or invited lectures delivered by him include the lecture on Extreme Light, Extreme States of Infosys Science Foundation in March 2016.

Awards and honors 
Ravindra Kumar was awarded the B. M. Birla Science Prize by B. M. Birla Science Centre in 2000. The Council of Scientific and Industrial Research awarded him the Shanti Swarup Bhatnagar Prize, one of the highest Indian science awards in 2003. The Indian Academy of Sciences elected him as a fellow in 2004 and he received the Salute Mumbai Award in 2005. The Department of Atomic Energy honored his work during the period between 2006 and 2011 with DAE-SRC Outstanding Research Investigator Award and the elected fellowship of the Indian National Science Academy reached him in 2008. The Infosys Science Foundation presented the Infosys Prize to him in 2015.

Selected bibliography

See also 
 List of BITS alumni

Notes

References

Further reading

External links 
 

Recipients of the Shanti Swarup Bhatnagar Award in Physical Science
Scientists from Mumbai
Indian scientific authors
1961 births
Fellows of the Indian Academy of Sciences
Fellows of the Indian National Science Academy
Indian optical physicists
Living people